A no-show is a condition when an expected person does not arrive or appear somewhere they were expected to be. In aviation, no-show is when a ticketed passenger doesn't show up for their flight. Such passenger are also sometimes called a no-show.

Airlines attempt to reduce losses caused by no-shows by employing tactics such as overbooking, reconfirmation, and no-show penalty charges. The U.S. government warns consumers to not be a no-show.

Some airlines include a no-show clause in their Contract of carriage. It basically means that a user not showing up for the outbound flight will be considered a no-show, and all the connecting flights associated with this one, even a return flight, will be cancelled and no refund will apply.

This is an example of no-show clause in the terms of use of Swiss International Air Lines (SWISS):

While it is not clear if carriers should refund users regarding navigation taxes (related to the airline operation and to the governments, which do not appear on a ticket), other expenses, like security, air passenger duty, and noise/environmental can all be refunded, as these all relate to the passenger's use of any particular airport to depart/arrive on any particular flight.

This clause has raised much concern among users, and court rulings have converged to the conclusion that "carriers cannot force passengers to fly".

Often no-shows are treated the same way regardless of reason. This means that a passenger who is delayed by a problem during the travel to airport will get the return flight cancelled even if wanting to rebook the outbound flight at the airport. A new ticket bought shortly before departure often needs to be business class due to airline policy.

References

Airline tickets